The 1965 Richmond Spiders football team represented the University of Richmond as a member of the Southern Conference (SoCOn) during the 1965 NCAA University Division football season. Led by Ed Merrick in his 15th and final season as head coach, the Spiders compiled an overall record 0–10 with a mark of 0–6 in conference play, placing last out of nine teams in the SoCon.
Richmond  played home games at City Stadium in Richmond, Virginia.

Schedule

References

Richmond
Richmond Spiders football seasons
College football winless seasons
Richmond Spiders football